Minami-machi 2-chome is a Hiroden station (tram stop) on Hiroden Hijiyama Line, located in Minami-ku, Hiroshima.

Routes
From Minami-machi 2-chome Station, there are one of Hiroden Streetcar routes.

 Hiroshima Station - (via Hijiyama-shita) - Hiroshima Port Route

Connections
█ Hijiyama Line

Minami-kuyakusho-mae — Minami-machi 2-chome — Minami-machi 6-chome

History
Opened on December 27, 1944
Service was stopped on February 1, 1945
 Reopened on July 1, 1948

See also

Hiroden Streetcar Lines and Routes

References

External links

Minami-machi 2-chome Station
Railway stations in Japan opened in 1944